The 2009–10 season of the F. League is the 3rd season of top-tier futsal in Japan.

Teams

Stadia and locations

Yoyogi National Gymnasium in Tokyo is used for the "neutral tiebreaker" fixture.

League table

Source: F. League

References

External links
F. League

See also
F. League
Futsal in Japan

2009 10
2009 in futsal
2010 in futsal